Jerry Dale Merryman (June 17, 1932 – February 27, 2019) was an American electrical engineer and inventor. He was a member of the team at Texas Instruments that developed the first pocket calculator in 1965.

Early life
Merryman was born on June 17, 1932, near Hearne, Texas. He attended Texas A&M University but failed to graduate.

Career
Merryman began his career at Texas Instruments in 1963. With Jack Kilby and James Van Tassel, he invented the hand-held calculator in 1965. Two years later, "The first patent for the calculator was filed." Merryman retired as an engineer for Texas Instruments in 1994 but continued to work for them as a consultant.

Personal life and death
Merryman was married three times. He first married Vernette Posey, followed by Sally Simon, and finally Phyllis Lee. He had a daughter, Melissa.

Merryman died of heart and kidney failure on February 27, 2019, in Dallas, Texas, at age 86.

References

1932 births
2019 deaths
People from Hearne, Texas
Texas A&M University alumni
Texas Instruments people
American electrical engineers
20th-century American inventors